Banyat Bantadtan (林書清) (born 15 May 1942) is a Thai politician. From 2003 to 2005, he was the chairman of the Democrat Party and Leader of the Opposition against Prime Minister Thaksin Shinawatra.

Life and career 
Banyat Bantadtan was born in Kanchanadit, Surat Thani Province. A lawyer by training, he holds a Bachelor of Laws from the Faculty of Law, Thammasat University. In 1970, he became a lecturer for the Office of Accelerated Rural Development (ARD). In 1975, he was elected Member of Parliament for the first time. He was consistently re-elected in all subsequent elections until 2007.

Banyat was spokesman of the Democrat Party from 1979 to 1980. He was a cabinet member in the governments of General Prem Tinsulanonda, as deputy interior minister from 1980 to 1983, Minister in the Office of Prime Minister from 1983 to 1986, and as Minister of Science from 1986 to 1988. Under his fellow party member Prime Minister Chuan Leekpai, Banyat was Deputy Prime Minister from 1992 to 1995 and again in 2000, when he additionally led the Ministry of Interior.

Democrat Party career 
In 2003, he succeeded Chuan as chairman of the Democrat Party and became official Leader of the Opposition. He stepped back after the electoral setback in 2005. The Thai Rak Thai Party of Prime Minister Thaksin Shinawatra had won the election by a landslide. The party chose Abhisit Vejjajiva as his successor.

Personal life
Banyat was married to Somnuk Boonchu and they had one child, then were divorced. After the divorce he married Jittima Sangkasap ex-wife of Pongpol Adireksarn. They have two children.

Honours
 1982 -  Knight Grand Cordon (Special Class) of the Most Noble Order of the Crown of Thailand
 1983 -  Knight Grand Cordon (Special Class) of the Most Exalted Order of the White Elephant

References

External links
 Banyat Bantadtan
 Thai PM's party win by landslide - TV exit poll
 Thai Opposition Warns of Dictatorship in Thailand

Living people
Hainanese people
Banyat Bantadtan
Banyat Bantadtan
Banyat Bantadtan
Banyat Bantadtan
Banyat Bantadtan
Banyat Bantadtan
Banyat Bantadtan
Banyat Bantadtan
Banyat Bantadtan
1942 births